The European Network of Information Centres (ENIC) were established in 1994 as a joint initiative of UNESCO and the Council of Europe. They are intended to implement the Lisbon recognition convention (LRC) and, in general, to develop policy and practice for the recognition of qualifications. The ENIC Network works closely with the NARIC network of the European Union.

ENIC legally complies with Article X.1(b) and X.3 of the LRC.

Network and members

The network is made up of several countries, where each country represents a party, and each party appoints a National information Centre as a member of the ENIC Network. In this sense, each country or a member holds one vote. There is an annual meeting where all the members meet. ENIC also elects three official representatives to the ENIC Bureau (EB) for a two-year mandate. There are a total of 54 members;  ENIC usually offers the following information for its members: 

National Information Centres
National education bodies
System of education
University education
Quality Assurance in Higher Education
Post-secondary non-university education
Recognised higher education institutions
Policies and procedures for the recognition of qualifications
Recognition of Qualifications held by Refugees
Qualifications Framework
Diploma Supplement Information
Access to higher education
Verification sources

References

See also
NARIC

Academia in Europe
Educational organizations based in Europe
Higher education accreditation
Higher education organisations based in Europe